Going Strong is the debut album by American rock band Strength, released in 2006.

Track listing
Let's Cruise (In A Non-Cruisin' Zone) – 4:00
Burning Up For Two – 4:40
See Her – 4:26
Press Up – 3:46
I Tilt My Head Back – 5:01
Ice Pink Storm – 4:04
We Are Who We Say We Are – 3:48
Run The Bridge – 4:02

References

2006 debut albums
Strength (band) albums